Jafarabad-e Pain or Jafarabad Payin may refer to:
 Jafarabad-e Pain, Fars
 Jafarabad-e Pain, Isfahan
 Jafarabad-e Pain, North Khorasan